This is a list of Soviet secret police officers and agents who have defected.

See also
 List of GRU defectors
 List of Soviet and Eastern Bloc defectors
 List of Soviet Union defections
 List of Cold War pilot defections
 Petrov Affair

References

Further reading
 Richelson, Jeffrey. (1999). The U.S. Intelligence Community: Fourth Edition [Book]. WestView Press, 

Soviet defectors
Def
KGB
KGB defectors
Soviet spies
Lists of Soviet people